Francis del Valle Gago Aponte (born 1973 in Maturín, Venezuela) is a Venezuelan model and beauty pageant titleholder who won Miss World Venezuela 1992 and also won Reina Sudamericana 1992 and placed second runner-up to Miss World 1992 as Miss World Americas.

Miss World Venezuela

Reina Sudamericana
Prior to traveling to South Africa for Miss World 1992, she participated in Reina Sudamericana 1992, held in Santa Cruz, Bolivia, on November 8, where she became Venezuela's first ever titleholder.

Miss World 1992
As the official representative of her country to the Miss World 1992 pageant held in Sun City, South Africa on December 12, 1992, she became Miss World Americas and 2nd runner-up to eventual winner Julia Kourotchkina of Russia.

References

External links
 Miss Venezuela Official Website
 Miss World Official Website

1973 births
Living people
People from Maturín
Miss Venezuela World winners
Miss World 1992 delegates